The RTÉ Executive Board, despite its name, is not a board of directors, but rather is a committee composed of the senior management of the Irish public service broadcaster, Raidió Teilifís Éireann, responsible for the day-to-day running of the broadcaster.

The executive board reports to the RTÉ Board through the director general.

Composition
The executive board is chaired by the Director-General of RTÉ, Dee Forbes.

The board was made up of the managing directors of television, radio, news & current affairs, and corporate development, the chief digital officer, the chief technology officer, the chief financial officer, and the group commercial director until 2017.

The director general is appointed by the RTÉ Board, with the consent of the government and the Minister for Media, Tourism, Arts, Culture, Sport and the Gaeltacht, while the other board members are appointed by the director-general.

In October 2017 a new executive board was put in place the new board dropped the Director of TV and the Director of Radio, replacing them with the Director of Content and the Director of Audience, Channels and Marketing. Frances Abeton left the role of Director of Operations and Production Services at the end of 2018. Willie O'Reilly took up the position of chairman of iRadio, with Geraldine O'Leary taking his position as commercial director, she initially did not sit on the executive board. In 2019 Rory Coveney became Director of Strategy and was appointed to the board, Geraldine O'Leary was also appoint to the board. In 2019 Paula Mullooly joined the Executive board as Legal Director. In 2020 Breda O'Keeffe retired as CFO and was replaced by Richard Collins. On 21 June 2022, Jon Williams announced his resignation as Managing Director of RTÉ News and Current Affairs and stepped down at the end of July. He was replaced by Deirdre McCarthy on an interim basis. On 19 December 2022, Deirdre took the position of Managing Director of RTÉ News & Current Affairs. 

Currently the members of the executive board are:

Mission to Prey
Following RTÉ's defamation of Father Kevin Reynolds in its "Mission to Prey" episode of Prime Time, RTÉ announced that Ed Mulhall, MD News, had "retired" on 3 April 2012.

References

Executive Board